Grammatidae is a small family of ray-finned fishes which were formerly placed in the order Perciformes but are now regarded as being incertae sedis in the subseries Ovalentaria in the clade Percomorpha. They are commonly known as basslets. They are marine fish found in the tropical western Atlantic Ocean.

They are characterized in part by a broken or absent lateral line. The largest species reach around 10 centimeters in maximum length.

Some basslets are colorful and are kept in marine aquaria.

There are two genera: 
 Gramma
 Lipogramma

A number of other species may be called "basslets", in particular members of Serranidae, where they may be called "fairy basslets".

Gallery

References

 
Marine fish families
Taxa named by David Starr Jordan
Taxa named by Barton Warren Evermann
Ovalentaria